Freshen Up was a concert tour by English musician Paul McCartney that commenced on 17 September 2018 with a four-concert leg in Canada. The tour was McCartney's first tour after the release of his album Egypt Station, which was released on 7 September. As with McCartney's other concert tours as a solo artist, the setlist for the Freshen Up tour was composed of songs by his former bands the Beatles and Wings, as well as songs from his solo career.

Prior to the announcement of the tour, McCartney revealed he would headline the 17th Austin City Limits Music Festival at Zilker Park, in October 2018. In November 2019, the tour was extended into the following year, to include McCartney's first concerts in Italy since his Out There tour. In the end, the tour was performed across venues in North America, Japan, Europe, and South America. A headlining appearance at the 2020 Glastonbury Festival was to be the final concert of the tour; however, it was cancelled due to the COVID-19 pandemic, which later led to the cancelation of all the concerts scheduled for 2020.

Tour band

Tour dates

Cancelled shows

Setlist

Typical set list

 "A Hard Day's Night"
 "Hi, Hi, Hi" or "Junior's Farm" or "Save Us"
 "Can't Buy Me Love" or "All My Loving"
 "Letting Go" 
 "Who Cares"
 "Got to Get You Into My Life" (since Tokyo)
 "Come On To Me"
 "Let Me Roll It"  (with "Foxy Lady" coda)
 "I've Got a Feeling"
 "Let 'Em In" 
 "My Valentine"
 "Nineteen Hundred and Eighty-Five"
 "Maybe I'm Amazed"
 "I've Just Seen a Face" or "We Can Work It Out"
 "In Spite of All the Danger"
 "From Me To You"
 "Dance Tonight" (since Copenhagen)
 "Love Me Do"
 "Blackbird"
 "Here Today"
 "Queenie Eye"
 "Lady Madonna"
 "Eleanor Rigby"
 "Fuh You"
 "Being for the Benefit of Mr. Kite!"
 "Something"
 "Ob-La-Di, Ob-La-Da"
 "Band on the Run" 
 "Back in the U.S.S.R."
 "Let It Be"
 "Live and Let Die"
 "Hey Jude"
Encore
 "Yesterday" or "Birthday" or "I Saw Her Standing There"
 "Sgt. Pepper's Lonely Hearts Club Band (Reprise)"
 "Helter Skelter"
 "Golden Slumbers"/"Carry That Weight"/"The End"

Set lists

See also
List of Paul McCartney concert tours

Notes

References

2018 concert tours
2019 concert tours
Paul McCartney concert tours
Concert tours cancelled due to the COVID-19 pandemic